Deutzia setchuenensis, the Sichuan deutzia, is a species of flowering plant in the family Hydrangeaceae, native to southeast and south-central China. The variety Deutzia setchuenensis var. corymbiflora, called the corymbose deutzia or Chinese snow flower, has gained the Royal Horticultural Society's Award of Garden Merit. It prefers full or partial sunlight, in moist fertile soil.

References

setchuenensis
Endemic flora of China
Flora of South-Central China
Flora of Southeast China
Plants described in 1896